A Shadow Cabinet of Italy had been announced on 15 April 2008, by Walter Veltroni, Secretary of the Democratic Party, after the 2008 Italian general election and officially presented on 9 May.

The new party Secretary Dario Franceschini announced on 21 February 2009 that he will dissolve the Shadow Cabinet.

References 

Politics of Italy
Shadow cabinets